Berwyn is a settlement in Denbighshire, Wales. The settlement is situated a mile north-west of Llangollen and is adjacent to the River Dee. The Horseshoe Falls is nearby. Berwyn has a station on the Llangollen Railway.

Despite the name, it is not particularly close to the hill Cadair Berwyn, the highest point in the county, or the Berwyn range of hills, being in the Dee valley.

References

Populated places in Denbighshire
Villages in Denbighshire
Llangollen